Spatalistis egesta is a species of moth of the family Tortricidae. It is found in Japan (Honshu), the Russian Far East and China (Shanxi, Zhejiang).

The wingspan is 12–15 mm. The forewings are orangeous to ochreous orange. The pattern is black in the form of an irregularly edged basal blotch, connecting submedially or subdorsally with a broad irregularly concave proximal edge of the median fascia. There are two or three groups of erects scales and refractive, diffused markings on the pattern. The hindwings are brownish, somewhat paler basally.

The larvae feed on Cornus controversa and Rhamnus costata.

References

Moths described in 1974
egesta